Francisco António de Almeida (c. 1702–1755) was a Portuguese composer and organist.

From 1722 to 1726 he was a royal scholar in Rome. In 1724, Pier Leone Ghezzi drew his caricature, describing him as "a young but excellent composer of concertos and church music who sang with extreme taste". He returned to Portugal in 1726, where he became organist of the Royal and Patriarchal Chapel.

In 1728, the first of his serenatas, Il trionfo della virtù, was performed in Lisbon at the palace of Cardinal João da Mota e Silva. His comic opera, La pazienza di Socrate, was performed at the royal palace in 1733. It was the first Italian opera in Portugal. A contemporary diarist states that Almeida composed music for the popular performances of presépios (Nativity scenes) in the Mouraria quarter of Lisbon. He probably died in the Lisbon earthquake of 1755.

Selected works 
Il pentimento di Davidde (componimento sacro), 1722
La Giuditta (oratorio), 1726 (first modern performances were in 1990, and it was described as a masterpiece.
Il trionfo della virtù (componimento poetico), 1728
Il trionfo d'amore (Almeida) (scherzo pastorale), 1729
Gl'incanti d'Alcina (dramma per musica da cantarsi), 1730
La Spinalba, ovvero Il vecchio matto (dramma comico), 1739
L’Ippolito (serenata), 1752

References

Bibliography 
Manuel Carlos de Brito: Almeida, Francisco António de, Grove Music Online ed. L. Macy (Retrieved 2007-05-05), Grove Music Online 
Manuel Carlos de Brito: Opera in Portugal in the Eighteenth Century (Cambridge, 1989)

External links
 Sinfonia (in F) - on-going cooperative transcription in the Wiki-score platform of the score of this symphony by Francisco António de Almeida.

See also 
 Carlos Seixas
 António Teixeira

Portuguese Baroque composers
Portuguese classical organists
Male classical organists
18th-century Portuguese people
1700s births
1755 deaths
18th-century classical composers
18th-century male musicians
18th-century musicians
18th-century keyboardists
Portuguese male classical composers